This list contains the players who represented Hampshire County Cricket Club in first-class matches from 1864 to the last match against Warwickshire at the end of the 2022 season. Hampshire till then has been represented by 726 players in first-class cricket.

Hampshire County Cricket Club was founded in 1863. Hampshire county cricket teams formed by earlier organisations, principally the Hambledon Club and dating back to the 18th century, always had first-class status and so the county club was rated accordingly from its foundation in 1864 until 1885. Then, after a nine-year break, it was classified as an official first-class team from 1895 by Marylebone Cricket Club (MCC) and the County Championship clubs.

The club's first match was played in 1864 against Sussex at the Antelope Ground. Led by George Ede, Hampshire lost by 10 wickets. Over the next 21 years, Hampshire played 74 first-class matches, although with little success. Following years of difficult circumstances and poor results to 1885, Hampshire is not rated a first-class team between 1886 and 1894.

Players are listed in order of appearance, where players made their debut in the same match, they are ordered by batting order.

Key

List of players

See also
 Hampshire County Cricket Club
 List of Hampshire County Cricket Club List A players
 List of Hampshire County Cricket Club Twenty20 players
 List of international cricketers from Hampshire

References

Bibliography

Further reading
 
  

First-class